Turkey Taekwondo Federation is the governing body of Taekwondo sport  in Turkey. Originally, it was formed in 1968 within the Turkey Judo Federation, where it maintained its activities thirteen years long. In 1981, it was disconnected from the Judo Federation and became a separate organization under the governmental Directorate General of Youth and Sports (Gençlik ve Spor Genel Müdürlüğü, GSGM). The headquarters is located in Ulus quarter of Ankara. It is a member of the European Taekwondo Union (ETU).

It organizes tournaments and championships for all age groups of both genders at national level. In addition, support services like the education of referees and coaches are within its duties. Participations of Turkish Taekwondo sportspeople at all international competition events are organized by the federation.

History
Taekwondo sport began in Turkey in the 1960s, and its official organizational formation took place in 1968 within the national Judo federation. In 1976, Turkey participated at the European championships, where the Turkish team came in second. Following the establishment of the self-contained federation in 1981, international success came for the women as well. In 1982, a Turkish woman became for the first time European champion and in 1987 a world champion. In 1988 and 1990, Turkish team became twice European champion. In 1995, the Turkish team placed in third rank at the World Championships. At the 1998 European Championships, Turkey national team became champion.

Achievements

Seniors

Olympic Games

World Championships

World Cup Team Championships

DNP: Did not participate

European Championships

Universiades

Juniors

World Junior Championships

European Junior Championships

International competitions hosted
 1988 European Taekwondo Championships - May 26–29, Ankara
 1998 World Junior Taekwondo Championships - September 9–13, Istanbul
 2002 European Taekwondo Championships - May 6–10, Samsun
 2007 European Poomse Championships - December 8–9, Antalya
 2008 European Taekwondo Team Championships - November 1–2, Konya
 2008 World Junior Taekwondo Championships - May 8–11, Izmir
 2012 Mediterranean Taekwondo Championships - June 30-July 1, Bursa

Champion taekwondo practitioners
Male
 Rıdvan Baygut (born 1985), European (2008, 2010)
 Metin Şahin (born 1963), European (1986, 1990)
 Yunus Sarı (born 1991), European (2013)
 Bahri Tanrıkulu (born 1980), World (2001, 2007, 2009), European (2000, 2002)
 Servet Tazegül (born 1988), Olympics (2012), World (2011), European (2008, 2010, 2012, 2014, 2016)

Female
 Zeliha Ağrıs (born 1998), World (2017)
 Arzu Ceylan, European (1990)
 Sibel Güler (born 1984), European (2004, 2006)
 Nafia Kuş  (born 1995), European (2018)
 Kadriye Selimoğlu (born 1978), World (2001)
 Arzu Tan] (born 1973), World (1991]
 Azize Tanrıkulu (born 1986), European (2005)
 Nur Tatar (born 1992), World (2017), European (2012)
 Hamide Bıkçın Tosun (born 1978), World (1995)
 İrem Yaman (born 1995), World (2015, 2019), European (2016, 2018)
 Hatice Kübra Yangın (born 1989), European (2008, 2012)
 Gülnur Yerlisu (born 1969), European (1992)
 Tennur Yerlisu (born 1966), World (1987), European (1982, 1984)
 Rukiye Yıldırım (born 1991 ), European (2010, 2018 )

Presidents
 Mithat Kor (1981–1982)
 Esen Beder (1982–1885)
 Cengiz Yağız (1996–2003)
 Metin Şahin (2003–present)

References 

Turkey
Taekwondo
Federation
1981 establishments in Turkey
Sports organizations established in 1981
Organizations based in Ankara
National Taekwondo teams